Marlon Versteeg (born 29 July 1997) is a Dutch footballer who plays for De Treffers.

Club career
He made his professional debut in the Eerste Divisie for De Graafschap on 5 August 2016 in a game against FC Eindhoven.

After loans to FC Lienden and SV Spakenburg, Versteeg moved to second-tier Tweede Divisie club De Treffers on a permanent deal in June 2020.

References

External links
 

1997 births
Footballers from Arnhem
Living people
Dutch footballers
De Graafschap players
Eerste Divisie players
Association football forwards
SBV Vitesse players
FC Lienden players
SV Spakenburg players
De Treffers players
Tweede Divisie players